Slava is a rural locality (a selo) in Novorossiysky Selsoviet of Mazanovsky District, Amur Oblast, Russia. The population was 1 as of 2018. There is 1 street.

Geography 

References 

Rural localities in Mazanovsky District